Fågelfors is a locality situated in Högsby Municipality, Kalmar County, Sweden with 424 inhabitants in 2010.

References 

Populated places in Kalmar County
Populated places in Högsby Municipality